Cruse may refer to:
 Cruse (surname), a list of people and a fictional character with this name
 Cruse Bereavement Care, a UK charity
 Cruse, Illinois, United States, an unincorporated community
 Cruse Memorial Heliport, a private heliport in Douglas County, Oregon, United States

See also
 Cruise (disambiguation)
 Cruz (disambiguation)
 Cruze (disambiguation)
 Widow's cruse: a reference to a story involving Elijah